Arpa Darrehsi or Arpa Darehsi may refer to:
 Arpa Darrehsi, Malekan
 Arpa Darrehsi, Tabriz